Péyi-A is a political party in Martinique.

History 
Péyi-A supported Jean-Luc Mélenchon in the 2022 French presidential election. Péyi-A contested the 2022 French legislative election as part of NUPES, and elected two members to the National Assembly; Marcellin Nadeau and Jean-Philippe Nilor.

References

See also 

Political parties established in 2019
Political parties in Martinique